Tsai Chuen-horng (born 11 March 1950) is an educator in Taiwan. He was the Minister and Chairman of the Atomic Energy Council of the Executive Yuan from 2008 to 2016.

Education
Tsai obtained his bachelor's degree in nuclear engineering from National Tsing Hua University (NTHU). He then continued his studies in the University of California, Berkeley in the United States for his master's and doctoral degrees in the same field.

Early career
Tsai held several positions in NTHU from 1982 until his ministry appointment in 2008, such as associate professor, professor and chairman or director of the Institute of Nuclear Engineering, dean of the Office of Student Affairs, professor of the Department of Nuclear Engineering and Engineering Physics, dean of the College of Nuclear Science, professor of the Department of Engineering and System Sciences, and distinguished professor.

See also
 Nuclear power in Taiwan

References

1950 births
Living people
Political office-holders in the Republic of China on Taiwan
Academic staff of the National Tsing Hua University
Taiwanese educators
National Tsing Hua University alumni
UC Berkeley College of Engineering alumni